Jeff Hamilton (born August 4, 1953) is an American jazz drummer and co-leader of the Clayton-Hamilton Jazz Orchestra. A former member of the L.A. Four, Hamilton has played with jazz pianist Monty Alexander, bandleader Woody Herman, and singer Rosemary Clooney, and has worked extensively with singer Diana Krall.

Early life
Hamilton was born in Richmond, Indiana, United States,. From a young age he took piano lessons but was inspired at age five by Gene Krupa and then began drumming at the age of eight. At fifteen, he was invited to play with the Earlham College jazz ensemble. He later attended Indiana University while studying under the tutelage of John Von Ohlen.

Music career
Starting in 1975, he was a member of Monty Alexander's Trio, then Woody Herman's Orchestra from 1977 until 1978. He was a member of the L.A. Four, with whom he made six albums. He co-leads the Clayton-Hamilton Jazz Orchestra with Jeff Clayton and John Clayton. He also leads his own trio, with Jon Hamar on bass and Tamir Hendelman on piano.

Hamilton has worked with Ella Fitzgerald, Rosemary Clooney, the Count Basie Orchestra, Oscar Peterson, and Ray Brown. He toured with Diana Krall and has played on several of her albums. In Japan with Krall in 2002, Hamilton became a fan of Hammond B3 organist Atsuko Hashimoto, and he recorded two albums with her.

Equipment
Hamilton was co-owner of Bosphorus Cymbals. He then started his own cymbal company, Crescent Cymbals, with Michael Vosbein, Bill Norman, and drummer Stanton Moore. Sabian bought out Crescent Cymbals and will be redistributing them through their "Hand-Hammered series." He also plays Mapex Black Panther drums and Remo drum heads (Fiberskyn 3 Diplomat) and his signature Regal Tip sticks and brushes.

Discography

As leader
 Indiana (Concord Jazz, 1992)
 It's Hamilton Time (Lake Street, 1994)
 Live! (Mons, 1996)
 Dynavibes (Mons, 1997)
 Hamilton House: Live at Steamers (Mons, 2000)
 Hands On (Mons, 2002)
 The Best Things Happen (Azica, 2004)
 From Studio 4, Cologne, Germany (Azica, 2006)
 Symbiosis (Capri, 2009)
 Red Sparkle (Capri, 2012)
 Time Passes On (Jazzed Media, 2012)
 The L.A. Session (In + Out, 2013)
 Live From San Pedro (Capri, 2018)
 Equal Time with Akiko Tsuruga, Graham Dechter (Capri, 2019)
 Catch Me If You Can (Capri, 2020)
 Merry & Bright (Capri, 2021)

With the L.A. 4
 1978 Just Friends
 1978 Watch What Happens
 1979 Live at Montreux
 1980 Zaca
 1981 Montage
 1982 Executive Suite

As sideman
With Monty Alexander
 1977 Live in Holland
 1979 Facets
 1983 Reunion in Europe
 1986 Li'l Darlin' 

With Ernestine Anderson
 1979 Sunshine 
 1983 Big City
 1989 Boogie Down

With Ray Brown
 1979 Live at the Concord Jazz Festival
 1988 Bam Bam Bam
 1988 Summer Wind: Live at the Loa
 1989 Black Orpheus 
 1991 Georgia on My Mind
 1991 Three Dimensional
 1993 Bassface Live at Kuumbwa
 1994 Don't Get Sassy

With Michael Bublé
 2005 It's Time
 2007 Call Me Irresponsible

With Benny Carter
 1994 Elegy in Blue (MusicMasters)

With Rosemary Clooney
 1979 Rosemary Clooney Sings the Lyrics of Ira Gershwin
 1989 Show Tunes
 1994 Still on the Road
 2000 Brazil

With Natalie Cole
 1991 Unforgettable... with Love
 1993 Take a Look
 1994 Holly & Ivy

With Scott Hamilton
 1979 Tenorshoes
 1991 Race Point
 2015 Live in Bern

With Atsuko Hashimoto
2008 Introducing Atsuko Hashimoto
2011 Until the Sun Comes Up

With Gene Harris
 1988 Tribute to Count Basie
 1989 Listen Here!
 1989 Live at Town Hall, N.Y.C.

With Diana Krall
 1993 Stepping Out
 1999 When I Look in Your Eyes 
 2001 The Look of Love
 2002 Live in Paris
 2006 From This Moment On
 2009 Quiet Nights
 2017 Turn Up the Quiet
 2020 This Dream of You

With Cory Weeds
2015 This Happy Madness
2017 Dreamsville

With others
 1977 Soul Fusion, Milt Jackson
 1979 Conception, Ted Nash
 1981 East of Suez, Jackie and Roy
 1982 Latin Odyssey, Laurindo Almeida
 1987 Spontaneous Combustion, Barney Kessel
 1988 Perfect Match, George Shearing
 1988 Reunion, Mel Tormé
 1992 Full Circle, Jackie and Roy
 1992 In Tribute, Diane Schuur
 1992 Midnight Sun, Herb Alpert
 1993 Back to Broadway, Barbra Streisand
 1994 Timepiece, Kenny Rogers
 1996 Prelude to a Kiss: The Duke Ellington Album, Dee Dee Bridgewater
 1998 Manilow Sings Sinatra, Barry Manilow
 1998 These Are Special Times, Céline Dion
 2004 Reneé Olstead, Renee Olstead
 2006 Dear Mr. Sinatra, John Pizzarelli
 2008 Blues & Beyond, WDR Big Band
 2012 It's a Wonderful World, Stacey Kent
 2012 Kisses on the Bottom, Paul McCartney
 2013 Wilford Brimley With the Jeff Hamilton Trio, Wilford Brimley
 2014 Life Journey, Leon Russell

References

External links
Official web site
Jeff Hamilton Interview NAMM Oral History Library (2018)

American jazz drummers
Big band bandleaders
Living people
Musicians from Richmond, Indiana
Musicians from Indiana
1953 births
20th-century American drummers
American male drummers
20th-century American male musicians
American male jazz musicians
Clayton-Hamilton Jazz Orchestra members
The L.A. Four (band) members